Cod Steaks, Ltd. is a Bristol-based model making company most notable for building sets and props for Aardman Animations productions, including all Wallace & Gromit feature films.

History 

Cod Steaks, Ltd. was founded in 1980 by Susannah Lipscombe and started out as a small model making company in the centre of the city of Bristol, UK. Over the following decades it evolved, moving further into the film industry, building full sets, props, costumes and miniatures for feature films, commercials and music videos.

The company moved to a larger location in 2004, allowing it to take on larger projects and incorporating new technology to produce sets and exhibitions faster and more efficiently.

On 10 October 2005, a fire in one of the Aardman Animations storage warehouses destroyed many of the sets and props built for Aardman by Cod Steaks.

Armouron 

Cod Steaks expanded into the toy design industry in 2010 with the development of Armouron, a role-play toy with interchangeable armour elements. The concept won an award at the 2010 Toy Fair and is being marketed by Bandai.

References

External links
Homepage
Cod Steaks Ltd. on IMDb

Scenic design
Aardman Animations